Henry Heyman (1610–1658) was an English politician.

Henry Heyman or Hayman may also refer to:

Sir Henry Pix Heyman, 5th Baronet (died 1808) of the Heyman baronets
Henry Hayman (cricketer) (1853–1941), cricketer
Henry Hayman (educationist) (1823–1904), British educator, headmaster of Rugby School
Henry Heyman (1855–1924), violinist

See also
Heyman (surname)